Sin senos sí hay paraíso, also known as Sin tetas sí hay paraíso in Colombia, is a Spanish-language telenovela that premiered on Telemundo on 19 July 2016. The telenovela is created by Gustavo Bolívar, based on the book Sin tetas sí hay paraíso, and in turn is a sequel to Sin senos no hay paraíso, and it is produced by Fox Telecolombia and Telemundo Studios for Telemundo, and distributed by Telemundo Internacional.

The series revolves around a high school student, Catalina Marín (Carolina Gaitán), and her sister Catalina Santana (Carmen Villalobos), two sisters who despite their financial adversities show that it is not necessary to resort to prostitution, drug trafficking and breast surgery in order to live well.

On 9 May 2019, Telemundo announced a spin-off series titled El final del paraíso that premiered on 13 August 2019, and ended on 9 December 2019. The spin-off marks the beginning of a new era of the series.

On 25 January 2023, Telemundo announced at their 2023 lineup presentation that the series had been renewed for a fourth season.

Seasons

Season 1 (2016) 
The series begins when Doña Hilda Santana (Catherine Siachoque), who is pregnant, receives the news of the death of her daughter Catalina "La Grande" (Carmen Villalobos), sending her into premature labor with her second daughter, Catalina "La Pequeña" (Carolina Gaitán). When Catalina (Carolina Gaitán) is born, her father Albeiro Marín (Fabián Ríos) and mother Hilda Santana fear she will share her late older sister's fate, as most of the young women in their neighborhood have historically become involved with prostitution and organized crime. In order to protect their daughter, Albeiro and Hilda paint a yellow boundary line outside of their home, forbidding Catalina from crossing it until she turns 18. Catalina then falls in love with a boy named Hernán Darío (Juan Pablo Urrego). After witnessing an attack upon Hernán Darío by Yésica Beltrán's (Majida Issa) bodyguards, Catalina crosses the yellow line to defend him. Hilda and Albeiro intervene to defend their daughter and are apprehended by the bodyguards. Yésica, resentful of Hilda, Albeiro, and Catalina, then orders her men to plant jewelry in Hilda's house in order to incriminate them for a crime they didn't commit. The police, by Yésica's orders, arrest Hernán Darío, Catalina, Doña Hilda, and Albeiro, incarcerating them in different prisons. Catalina is sent to an institution for juvenile girls , where she is beaten and abused by the fellow inmates and guards and nearly drowned under Yésica Beltrán's (Majida Issa) orders. Hernán Darío is beaten and humiliated as well until Yésica and her daughter Daniela (Johanna Fadul) force him to work for them, threatening to hurt his mother, his in-laws and Catalina. Albeiro, along with fellow inmate David, plot to break out of prison in order to escape. Journalist Daniel Cerón helps Catalina and her parents escape, but Hernán Darío, convinced that Catalina is still in prison and in danger, agrees to work for Yésica's daughter Daniela. Daniela, deeply infatuated with Hernán Darío and viciously jealous of his relationship with Catalina, continually attempts to seduce Hernán Darío while he works for her mother.

Season 2 (2017) 

The second season tells the story and the return of Catalina Santana (Carmen Villalobos), the eldest daughter of Doña Hilda Santana (Catherine Siachoque). Catalina was hiding for 20 years after allegedly being murdered, but actually worked as a TEA agent. During all the years of her supposed disappearance, she made her life next to Santiago Sanín (Roberto Manrique) a doctor with whom she had two children Mariana (Stephania Duque) and Sebastián (Johan Esteban Díaz). During her return Catalina is trapped in a world of feeling and guilt for her family, since her return would cause great tragedies and dislikes, especially in Albeiro (Fabián Ríos) who was previously her boyfriend, and for whom she will not know if she still feels something and her mother; who left her and cheated with Albeiro. Catalina meets her other sister Catalina Marín Santana (Carolina Gaitán) and her boyfriend Hernán Dario (Juan Pablo Urrego), with whom she joins to end with La Diabla (Majida Issa) and her daughter Daniela (Johanna Fadul), who will do everything possible to destroy the Santana family.

Season 3 (2018) 

The time has come to choose the most beautiful girl in the region. The catwalk has become a battlefield. The support of the Marín family towards Catalina La Pequeña (Carolina Gaitán) and Yésica Beltrán (Majida Issa) towards her daughter is immense since she is willing to do anything to see her daughter Daniela (Johanna Fadul) crowned as queen of the region. Yésica, who attends the event in disguise of her sister, has come in contact with the juries and seeks to bribe them to tilt their vote in favor of Daniela. But Catalina La Pequeña one stands out not only for her beauty but for her intelligence. The result of this contest will define the course of their lives. The relationship of Catalina La Pequeña and Hernán Darío (Juan Pablo Urrego) is threatened by Mariana's obsession. She will give birth to a beautiful girl and continue to claim that she is the daughter of Hernán Darío. Catalina La Pequeña doubt of the paternity of Hernán Darío and will do everything in his power to decipher the identity of the true father. It will not be an easy battle and Mariana will do everything possible to snatch the love of her life to Catalina La Pequeña.

On the other hand, the fearsome curse of the witch Abigail materializes. Catalina La Grande (Carmen Villalobos) and her friends know that their daughters are in danger. Adriana, Vanessa's daughter died, as did Martina, Paola's daughter, and now Catalina La Grande will have to redouble her efforts to take care of Mariana, while Ximena will take care of the steps of her daughter, Valentina. In this battle against evil they will have many allies but there is no lack of enemies.

Cast 

Notes

Ratings 
 
}}

Production 
The series is based on the book "Sin tetas sí hay paraíso" written by Gustavo Bolívar, who previously wrote "Sin tetas no hay paraíso". The series is known in Colombia as "Sin tetas si hay paraíso".

Casting 
The character of Yésica Beltrán, La Diabla, was originally interpreted by María Fernanda Yepes in Sin senos no hay paraíso, but she did not return for the sequel due to scheduling conflicts and personal reasons. Due to this, Majida Issa was cast to take over the role.
Carmen Villalobos was confirmed to reprise her role from the first installment of the series through a "special appearance" in flashback sequences. For the final episode of the first season of "Sin senos sí hay paraíso", the actress appeared again, bringing Catalina Santana back to life, and setting up the stage to continue as a main protagonist in the second season of the renewed series. Carolina Gaitán and Juan Pablo Urrego, who play Catalina "la pequeña" and Hernán Darío, had previously worked together on other projects.
This continuation to Sin senos no hay paraíso features several actors from the first series reprising their role, such as Francisco Bolívar, Alejandra Pinzón, Carolina Sepúlveda, Gregorio Pernía, Fabián Ríos, Catherine Siachoque and César Mora.

Music 

The first soundtrack of the series, titled Sin senos sí hay paraíso, was released on August 6, 2016.

Track listing

Awards and nominations

References

External links 
 

 
Spanish-language American telenovelas
Telemundo telenovelas
2016 telenovelas
2016 American television series debuts
2010s American LGBT-related drama television series
Colombian telenovelas
American telenovelas
2017 telenovelas
2016 Colombian television series debuts
Lesbian-related television shows
2018 telenovelas
Television series produced by Fox Telecolombia
2018 Colombian television series endings
Works about Colombian drug cartels